Built in 1888, Folly Lighthouse is a brick tower with lantern and gallery. The light is solar powered. A garden surrounds the lighthouse.

It is maintained by the Port Authority of Jamaica, an agency of the Ministry of Transport and Works.

See also

List of lighthouses in Jamaica

References

External links
 Historic photo.
 Aerial view.
 Photos:     .

Lighthouses completed in 1888
Lighthouses in Jamaica
Buildings and structures in Portland Parish